2021 is the fifth year in the history of Legacy Fighting Alliance, a mixed martial arts promotion based in the United States.

List of events

LFA Middleweight Tournament
In 2021, LFA organized a Middleweight tournament that will crown the Middleweight champion.

Legacy Fighting Alliance 97: Browne vs. Estrázulas

Legacy Fighting Alliance 97: Browne vs. Estrázulas is the ninety-eighth event of Legacy Fighting Alliance and will take place on January 15, 2021. It aired on UFC Fight Pass.

Background

The event was headlined by a fight between Nick Browne and Arthur Estrazulas, for the vacant LFA Lightweight title.

In the co-main event, the former LFA Lightweight title challenger Jacob Rosales faced Jose Martinez.

Results

Legacy Fighting Alliance 98: Fremd vs. Oliveira

Legacy Fighting Alliance 98: Fremd vs. Oliveira is the ninety-ninth event of Legacy Fighting Alliance and will take place on January 29, 2021. It aired on UFC Fight Pass.

Background
The event was headlined by a middleweight bout between Josh Fremd and Bruno Oliveira, which serves as the first middleweight tournament semi-final.

Results

Legacy Fighting Alliance 99: Dennis vs. Cherant

Legacy Fighting Alliance 99: Dennis vs. Cherant is the hundredth event of Legacy Fighting Alliance and will take place on February 12, 2021. It aired on UFC Fight Pass.

Background
The event was headlined by a fight between Myron Dennis and Fabio Cherant for the LFA Light Heavyweight Championship.

Results

Legacy Fighting Alliance 100: Altamirano vs. Smith

Legacy Fighting Alliance 100: Altamirano vs. Smith is the hundredth-first event of Legacy Fighting Alliance and took place on February 19, 2021. It aired on UFC Fight Pass.

Background
The event was supposed to be headlined by a flyweight bout between LFA's all-time wins leader Victor "El Magnifico" Altamirano and top undefeated Brazilian prospect Carlos "Tizil" Mota. The co-main event will showcase the second middleweight tournament semi-final between LFA standouts Anthony "SugaFoot" Adams and Gregory "RoboCop" Rodrigues. However, on February 13, Carlos Mota was pulled from the fight and replaced by Nate Smith.

Results

Legacy Fighting Alliance 101: Kalani vs. Cummins

Legacy Fighting Alliance 101: Kalani vs. Cummins is the hundredth-second event of Legacy Fighting Alliance and took place on March 12, 2021. It aired on UFC Fight Pass.

Background
LFA 101 was headlined by a bout between two middleweight prospects: Maika Graf and the undefeated AJ Dobson.

Results

Legacy Fighting Alliance 102: Souza vs. Johns

Legacy Fighting Alliance 102: Souza vs. Johns is the hundredth-third event of Legacy Fighting Alliance and took place on March 19, 2021. It aired on UFC Fight Pass.

Background
The main event featured a featherweight showdown between LFA standouts Bruno "The Tiger" Souza vs. Elijah "Baby" Johns. The co-main event showcased the second middleweight tournament semi-final bout between Dana White's Contender Series alumni Gregory Rodrigues and Al "Sweetness" Matavao.

Results

Legacy Fighting Alliance 103: Carlyle vs. Dagvadorj

Legacy Fighting Alliance 103: Carlyle vs. Dagvadorj is the hundredth-fourth event of Legacy Fighting Alliance and took place on March 26, 2021. It aired on UFC Fight Pass.

Background
The event was headlined by a lightweight bout between the UFC veteran Spike Carlyle and the one-time LFA Welterweight title challenger Batsumberel Dagvadorj.

Results

Legacy Fighting Alliance 104: McKenzie vs. Phillips

Legacy Fighting Alliance 104: McKenzie vs. Phillips is the hundredth-fifth event of Legacy Fighting Alliance and took place on April 16, 2021. It aired on UFC Fight Pass.

Background
The event was headlined by a lightweight contest between Aaron McKenzie and Brandon Phillips.

Results

Legacy Fighting Alliance 105: Rodriguez vs. Gotsyk

Legacy Fighting Alliance 105: Rodriguez vs. Gotsyk is the hundredth-sixth event of Legacy Fighting Alliance and took place on April 23, 2021. It aired on UFC Fight Pass.

Background
The event was headlined by bout for the LFA Women's Strawweight Championship between Svetlana Gotsyk and Piera Rodriguez.

Results

Legacy Fighting Alliance 106: Silveira vs. Viana 

Legacy Fighting Alliance 106: Silveira vs. Viana is the hundredth-seventh event of Legacy Fighting Alliance and took place on April 30, 2021. It aired on UFC Fight Pass.

Background
A light heavyweight bout between Joshua Silveira and Rafael Viana served as the main event.

Results

Legacy Fighting Alliance 107: Kirk vs. Swain

Legacy Fighting Alliance 107: Kirk vs. Swain is the hundredth-eighth event of Legacy Fighting Alliance and took place on May 14, 2021. It aired on UFC Fight Pass.

Background
The main event featured  a middleweight showdown between two of the most accomplished fighters in the division. Rafael Carvalho, former Bellator Middleweight Champion, faced emerging Tajik, Sharaf Davlatmurodov, who was riding a 5-fight win streak, which includes a win over Bellator middleweight tournament runner-up Brett Cooper.  The day after the announcement of the bout, it was announced that Carvalho was to face Lorenz Larkin at Bellator 258.

Results

Legacy Fighting Alliance 108: Fremd vs. Rodrigues 

Legacy Fighting Alliance 108: Fremd vs. Rodrigues is the hundredth-ninth event of Legacy Fighting Alliance and took place on May 21, 2021. It aired on UFC Fight Pass.

Background
The main event featured a middleweight title fight between two of the most exciting knockout artists in the division. Josh Fremd (7-1) and Gregory Rodrigues (8-3) both earned their shot at the LFA Middleweight Championship by advancing to the finale of the LFA Middleweight Tournament, which began in January. 

At weigh-ins, Clayton Carpenter came in at 128.6 pounds, 2.6 pounds over the non-championship flyweight limit. Therefore, the fight continued at catchweight and he was fined a percentage of his purse.

Results

Legacy Fighting Alliance 109: McKinney vs. Irizarry 

Legacy Fighting Alliance 109: McKinney vs. Irizarry is the hundredth-tenth event of Legacy Fighting Alliance and took place on June 5, 2021. It aired on UFC Fight Pass.

Background
Terrance McKinney, coming off a knockout win at LFA 107, is looking to solidify himself at the top of the lightweight division. He will face top Puerto Rican prospect Michael Irizarry in the main event of LFA 109.

Results

Legacy Fighting Alliance 110: Johnson vs. Horiuchi

Legacy Fighting Alliance 110: Johnson vs. Horiuchi is the hundredth-eleventh event of Legacy Fighting Alliance and took place on July 2nd, 2021. It aired on UFC Fight Pass.

Background
The main event will feature a LFA Light Heavyweight Championship title fight between top undefeated prospect Joshua Silveira and regional kingpin Jesse "Hollywood" Murray. The co-main event will also feature a title fight when top contenders Charles "Inner G" Johnson and Yuma Horiuchi vie for interim LFA Flyweight Championship. On June 29, Silveira vs. Murray was postponed to a later date and the Flyweight Interim title bout was promoted to the main event.

Results

Legacy Fighting Alliance 111: De Sa vs. Bonfim

Legacy Fighting Alliance 111: De Sa vs. Bonfim is the hundredth-twelfth event of Legacy Fighting Alliance and took place on July 16th, 2021. It aired on UFC Fight Pass.

Background
The event was headlined by a lightweight bout between Rangel De Sa and Ismael Bonfim.

Results

Legacy Fighting Alliance 112: Welterweight Tournament

Legacy Fighting Alliance 112: Welterweight Tournament is the hundredth-thirteenth event of Legacy Fighting Alliance and took place on July 19th, 2021. It aired on UFC Fight Pass.

Background
The event featured a welterweight tournament, held to determine the new LFA champion. Gabriel Bonfim met Brenner Alberth in the first semifinal bout, while Diego Dias met Carlos Leal in the second semifinal bout.

Results

Legacy Fighting Alliance 113: Lewis vs. Petersen

Legacy Fighting Alliance 113: Lewis vs. Petersen is the hundredth-fourteenth event of Legacy Fighting Alliance and took place on July 30th, 2021. It aired on UFC Fight Pass.

Background
The event was headlined by a heavyweight bout between Thomas Petersen and Vernon Lewis for the vacant LFA Heavyweight Championship.

Results

Legacy Fighting Alliance 114: Souza vs. Garcia

Legacy Fighting Alliance 114: Souza vs. Garcia is the hundredth-fifteenth event of Legacy Fighting Alliance and took place on August 27, 2021. It aired on UFC Fight Pass.

Background
An LFA Featherweight Championship bout for the vacant title between Bruno Souza and Javier Garcia headlined the event.

Results

Legacy Fighting Alliance 115: Silveira vs. Cummins

Legacy Fighting Alliance 115: Silveira vs. Cummins is the hundredth-fifteenth event of Legacy Fighting Alliance and took place on September 24, 2021. It aired on UFC Fight Pass.

Background

Results

Legacy Fighting Alliance 116: Fremd vs. Valente

Legacy Fighting Alliance 116: Fremd vs. Valente is the hundredth-sixteenth event of Legacy Fighting Alliance and took place on October 22, 2021. It aired on UFC Fight Pass.

Background
The event was headlined by a middleweight bout between Josh Fremd and Renato Valente.

Results

Legacy Fighting Alliance 117: Dias vs. Tanaka

Legacy Fighting Alliance 117: Dias vs. Tanaka is the hundredth-seventeenth event of Legacy Fighting Alliance and took place on November 5, 2021. It aired on UFC Fight Pass.

Background

Results

Legacy Fighting Alliance 118: Askar vs. Gomes

Legacy Fighting Alliance 118: Askar vs. Gomes is the hundredth-eighteenth event of Legacy Fighting Alliance and took place on November 12, 2021. It aired on UFC Fight Pass.

Background

Results

Legacy Fighting Alliance 119: Silveira vs. Revel

Legacy Fighting Alliance 119: Silveira vs. Revel was the hundredth-ninenth event of Legacy Fighting Alliance and took place on December 3, 2021. It aired on UFC Fight Pass.

Background
The event was headlined by a LFA Middleweight Championship bout for the vacant title between Josh Silveira and Jared Revel.

Results

Legacy Fighting Alliance 120: Cantuária vs. Horth 

Legacy Fighting Alliance 120: Cantuária vs. Horth was the hundredth-tenth event of Legacy Fighting Alliance and took place on December 10, 2021. It aired on UFC Fight Pass.

Background
The event was headlined by a LFA Women's Flyweight Championship bout for the vacant title between Jamey-Lyn Horth Wessels and Mayra Cantuária.

Results

See also 
 2021 in UFC
 2021 in Bellator
 2021 in ONE Championship
 2021 in Rizin Fighting Federation
 2021 in Konfrontacja Sztuk Walki
 2021 in Absolute Championship Akhmat
 2021 in Brave Combat Federation
2021 in Fight Nights Global

References

External links
  Legacy Fighting Alliance Official website

Legacy Fighting Alliance
2021 in mixed martial arts
2021 sport-related lists